Jatibarang District is the name of an administrative district (Indonesian: Kecamatan) in Brebes Regency, Central Java, Indonesia.

Jatibarang town
In Jatibarang there are remains of a colonial Dutch sugar factory.

List of villages
 Bojong
 Buaran
 Janegara
 Jatibarang Kidul
 Jatibarang Lor
 Kalialang
 Kalipucang
 Karanglo
 Kebogadung
 Kebonagung
 Kedungtukang
 Kemiriamba
 Kendawa
 Kertasinduyasa
 Klampis
 Klikiran
 Kramat
 Pamengger
 Pedeslohor
 Rengasbandung
 Tegalwulung
 Tembelang

Border
North:	 Brebes District
South:	 Tegal Regency
West:	 Songgom District
East:	 Tegal Regency

Interesting places
 Al-Ittihad Mosque Jatibarang
 Jatibarang Brebes Sugar Mill

Others
"Sate Goat" (Indonesia: Sate Kambing) Food that is the most famous In Jatibarang, has a unique taste. With a pin coconut palm leaf rib. sate is not like other sate goat which generally use bamboo burned with charcoal, which is a special tree Semboja. perhaps with charcoal aroma sate this will have a special taste.

References

Brebes Regency
Districts of Central Java